Norrlinia is a genus of two species of fungi in the family Verrucariaceae. The genus was circumscribed by Ferdinand Theissen and Hans Sydow in 1918. The genus name honours the Finnish botanist Johan Petter Norrlin. Both species are lichenicolous, meaning they parasitise lichens. The host of both fungi is the foliose genus Peltigera.

Species
 Norrlinia medoborensis 
 Norrlinia peltigericola 

The taxon once known as Norrlinia trypetheliza  is now Cercidospora trypetheliza.

References

Verrucariales
Eurotiomycetes genera
Taxa described in 1918
Taxa named by Hans Sydow
Taxa named by Ferdinand Theissen
Lichenicolous fungi